Lothar Späth (16 November 1937 – 18 March 2016) was a German politician of the CDU.

Life

Späth was born in Sigmaringen.
From 30 August 1978 to 13 January 1991 Späth was the 5th Minister President of Baden-Württemberg and chairman of the CDU Baden-Württemberg, serving as the 36th President of the Bundesrat in 1984/85.

After leaving politics, Späth headed the Jenoptik company, one of the few former Eastern German state owned enterprises, which survived the transformation into a market economy in a united Germany. He stayed there until 2003. Then he became president of the Industrie- und Handelskammer East-Thuringia in Gera.

In order to support medium-sized companies in opening up foreign markets, he set up the "Baden-Württemberg Export Foundation" in 1984, today Baden-Württemberg International.

In 1989, he sponsored the publication of an art portfolio called Kinderstern, featuring original drawings by Sol LeWitt, Jörg Immendorff, Sigmar Polke, Max Bill, Heinz Mack, Keith Haring and Imi Knoebel, to benefit children cancer patients. Along with Rupert Neudeck, he is also a patron of the "German Economic Foundation for Humanitarian Help".

In September 1992 Späth was awarded the title of Royal Norwegian Honorary Consul General for Thuringia and Saxony-Anhalt.

From 1998–2001, Späth hosted a TV talk show broadcast in Germany called "Späth am Abend", delivering weekly political commentaries beginning in 2002. (The title is a play on words between "Late at night" (Spät am Abend) and "Späth in the evening", a reference to the host's name.)

Literature
 Marlis Prinzing: Lothar Späth – Wandlungen eines Rastlosen. Orell Füssli Verlag, Zürich 2006, .
 Stefan Wogawa: Lothar Späth. Blick hinter eine (Selbst-)Inszenierung. OWUS e. V., Bad Salzungen 2010. (Reihe Wirtschaft & Politik, Bd. 1)
 Marlis Prinzing, Lothar Späth: "Wir schaffen das" – Antworten auf die Krise – Perspektiven für die Zukunft. Marlis Prinzing trifft Lothar Späth. Kaufmann, Lahr 2009, .

References

External links

Catalogue of Deutsche Nationalbibliothek 

1937 births
2016 deaths
People from Sigmaringen
Presidents of the German Bundesrat
Members of the Landtag of Baden-Württemberg
Christian Democratic Union of Germany politicians
People from the Province of Hohenzollern
Grand Crosses 1st class of the Order of Merit of the Federal Republic of Germany
Recipients of the Order of Merit of Baden-Württemberg
Ministers-President of Baden-Württemberg